General elections were due to be held in Malawi on 17 April 1971, the first since the pre-independence elections in 1964. The Malawi Congress Party had been the only legally permitted party in the country since 1966.  Each of the 60 constituencies had three to five candidates nominated by party committees. These candidates were then submitted to President Hastings Banda, who selected a single candidate for each seat. As there was only one candidate for each constituency, no voting actually took place on election day, as there was no opposition.

However, only 56 of the seats were filled, and following the election, Banda nominated another eight members to the National Assembly.

Results

References

Malawi
1971 in Malawi
Elections in Malawi
One-party elections
Single-candidate elections
April 1971 events in Africa
Uncontested elections